49 Persei is a star in the northern constellation of Perseus. It is just visible to the naked eye as a dim, orange-hued star with an apparent visual magnitude of 6.09. It has a relatively large proper motion, traversing the celestial sphere at a rate of ·yr−1.

This is an aging red giant star with a stellar classification of K1III, a star that has used up its core hydrogen and is expanding. It is a candidate horizontal branch star, which would indicate it is past the red giant branch stage and is fusing helium at its core. The star is nearly four billion years old with 1.4 times the mass of the Sun and 3.7 times the Sun's radius. It is radiating eight times the luminosity of the Sun from its photosphere at an effective temperature of 5,028 K.

References

K-type giants
Perseus (constellation)
Durchmusterung objects
Persei, 49
025975
019302
1277